Alexander Roy Outram (19 February 1901 – 27 March 1987) was an Australian rules footballer who played with Collingwood and Richmond in the Victorian Football League (VFL).

Outram was recruited from Kyabram, in the Goulburn Valley Football League.

Brother of former St. Kilda and Carlton Football Club player Percy Outram.

Notes

External links 

Roy Outram's profile at Collingwood Forever

1901 births
1987 deaths
Australian rules footballers from Victoria (Australia)
Collingwood Football Club players
Richmond Football Club players
People from Kyneton